Robert Kurvitz (born 8 October 1984) is an Estonian novelist, video game designer, and musician. He was the lead designer of the 2019 video game Disco Elysium as a founding member of the ZA/UM cultural association and the eponymous video game development company that grew out of it. Kurvitz left the company in 2022.

Profile

Video games 
In 2016, Kurvitz founded the video game development company ZA/UM. ZA/UM's first game, a single-player computer roleplaying game titled Disco Elysium, was released on 15 October 2019. Kurvitz was the game's lead writer and designer, having produced about half of the total in-game text (half a million words). The game was set in the same world as Kurvitz's novel Sacred and Terrible Air. It received universal acclaim, being named as a game of the year by several publications, along with numerous other awards for its narrative and art.

Kurvitz claims to have developed the Elysium world since he was fifteen or sixteen, originally inspired by "a bootleg Finnish Middle Earth roleplay system". The game is also notable for having far less emphasis on violence than the norm for the RPG genre. Kurvitz considers some aspects of Disco Elysium "essentially Soviet", referencing the Soviet Union's science fiction tradition and the Strugatsky brothers: "They were people who took responsibility for the heat death of the universe", he explains. "When they were writing books, this needed to contribute to the ultimate fate of the universe. Because they didn't have money obligations, so what are your obligations then? So this kind of serious responsibility for, what the fuck does a piece of entertainment really do to the human mind, and what are the responsibilities therein, that I think is very, very, very prevalent in Disco Elysium."

Literature
In 2013, Kurvitz published the novel Sacred and Terrible Air, on which he had worked over five years. The novel, set in the fictional world of Elysium, centers on three men who, twenty years after the unexplained disappearance of their classmates, are still determined to locate them. It received positive reviews, with literary theorist Johanna Ross highlighting it as one of the few books to successfully bridge science fiction and "literature proper". The literary scientist Jaak Tomberg emphasized the great attention to detail in his review: "Through that novel we bear witness to (1) a style which seems to be in its actually realistic and simply reflective way to be attentive towards the world to an almost paranoid degree, and (2) to a made-up world, which in its relentless interconnectedness is far more systemic than the reality we recognize as 'our own' and also remarkably more systemic than most of the fictional ones, which may by their similar way of building reservedly be called 'fantastic'." Despite its positive critical reception, the book was a commercial failure, selling 1,000 copies, and causing Kurvitz to "succumb to a deep alcoholism". An English translation was predicted for 2020, but has not yet been published.

Having played tabletop roleplaying games for much of his life, Kurvitz uses worldbuilding techniques derived from Dungeons & Dragons, though opting for a pseudo-modernist fantasy world instead of a pseudo-medieval one. He employs help in the development of his ideas. "Mass editing" is employed as a tool in the finishing stage of the book; people of varying backgrounds assess the readability and realism of the work, point out confusing passages and suggest amendments.

Music
In 2001, Kurvitz became the lyricist and lead singer of progressive rock band Ultramelanhool, which has seen by many as a continuation of the Estonian alternative rock tradition developed by Vennaskond and Metro Luminal. The literary scientist Jaak Tomberg found however that such comparisons which come so easily in modern discourse may do a disservice to the band's actual original character.

The band failed to secure an Estonian record label for their second album. It was then self-released with money inherited by Kurvitz's long-time friend, editor and collaborator Martin Luiga, and released on the internet for free. In 2011, Kurvitz collaborated on his father's album Forbidden to Sing, providing backing vocals and keyboards.

Politics 
Kurvitz has a green-gold bust of Lenin on his writing desk, which he claimed formerly belonged to Estonian communist writer Juhan Smuul. "I guess my favourite thing I like to say about this is that for me it's just a wholesome tradition. It's about loyalty, it's about the country where I was born. This is how I was raised, this was who I was told to follow, and I would be a naughty revolutionary, kind of an edgy rebel, if I wouldn't have Lenin on my writing desk." Kurvitz has also voiced his support for Tallinn's free mass transit system (active since 2013).

References 

1984 births
Living people
21st-century Estonian novelists
21st-century Estonian singers
Estonian male novelists
Musicians from Tallinn
Writers from Tallinn
Video game writers
People of Karelian descent